This is a list of transfers for the 2020 Canadian Premier League season.

This list includes all transfers involving Canadian Premier League clubs after their last match of the 2019 Canadian Premier League season and before their last match of the 2020 season.

Transfers
Clubs without a flag are Canadian.

References

Specific

2020
Transfers
Canadian Premier League
Canadian Premier League